Otrić  is a village in Croatia. It is connected by the D1 highway.

References

Populated places in Zadar County